CWO may refer to:

Cadet Warrant Officer, a cadet rank in the British Air Training Corps and the RAF Section of the Combined Cadet Force
Cadmium tungstate, a scintillator
Cash With Order, a standard UK commercial term
Chief Warrant Officer, a non-commissioned rank in the Canadian military
Chief Weather Officer
Chief Web Officer, an executive who is in charge of the web presence for an organisation
Communist Workers Organisation (disambiguation), one of several organisations
Completion and Workover, a subsea operation performed on subsea well
Conservative Women's Organisation, an organisation within the Conservative Party in the United Kingdom.
Contingent Workforce Outsourcing
Corrective Work Order, a penalty for littering in Singapore
Chief Warrant Officer, a warrant officer in the United States military in the grade of W-2 or higher.

cWo (Carolina World Order )